Powiat opolski may refer to either of two counties (powiats) in Poland:
Opole County, in Opole Voivodeship (SW Poland)
Opole Lubelskie County, in Lublin Voivodeship (E Poland)